Boudreault may refer to:

 Jeannette Boudreault-Lagassé (1941–2006), a Quebec writer
 Phillip Boudreault (born 1975), a former Canadian boxer
 Rivière des Boudreault, a tributary of the northwest shore of the Saint-Laurent river in Les Éboulements, Quebec, Canada